Hot Springs County–Thermopolis Municipal Airport is a general aviation airport 10 miles northwest of Thermopolis, Wyoming. The airport was opened in 2015 to replace the original Thermopolis Municipal Airport, which was in the city of Thermopolis, but was unsuitable to expansion. This airport has been discontinued since and now serves as part of the Thermopolis Golf Course.

In the year ending May 31, 2018, the airport had 2,510 aircraft operations, average 7 per day: 94% general aviation,  6% air taxi and 2% military. 11 aircraft at the time were based at the airport: 10 single-engine and 1 multi-engine.

References

Airports in Wyoming